Redwood Park is located on the escarpment of the Great Dividing Range in Redwood, Toowoomba, Queensland, Australia.

Facilities 
It has many walking, horse-riding and mountain-bike trails and a picnic area in the bushland.

History 
In 2020 Redwood Park was nominated for Heritage Listing by Scot McPhie. The Toowoomba Regional Council opposed the listing. In March 2021 the Queensland Government announced all of Redwood Park would not be heritage listed, but Eagles Nest Camp, a depression era itinerant workers camp located within Redwood, would be Heritage listed

References

External links
 Redwood Park - Redwood - Tooowooba Regional Council

Toowoomba
Parks in Queensland